Taeniotes inquinatus is a species of beetle in the family Cerambycidae. It was described by James Thomson in 1857. It is known from Ecuador, Costa Rica, Panama, Colombia, and Venezuela.

References

inquinatus
Beetles described in 1857